The following is a list of songs recorded by South Korean boy band Tomorrow X Together.



Recorded songs

Notes

References

Tomorrow X Together
Tomorrow X Together